The 30th Film Independent Spirit Awards, honoring the best independent films of 2014, were presented by Film Independent on February 21, 2015. The nominations were announced on November 25, 2014. The ceremony was hosted by Fred Armisen and Kristen Bell, and aired live for the first time on IFC.

Winners and nominees

{| class="wikitable"
!Best Feature
!Best Director
|-
|
Birdman
 Boyhood
 Love Is Strange
 Selma
 Whiplash
| Richard Linklater – Boyhood
 Damien Chazelle – Whiplash
 Ava DuVernay – Selma
 Alejandro G. Iñárritu – Birdman
 David Zellner – Kumiko, the Treasure Hunter
|-
!Best Male Lead
!Best Female Lead
|-
| Michael Keaton – Birdman as Riggan Thomson
 André 3000 – Jimi: All Is by My Side as Jimi Hendrix
 Jake Gyllenhaal – Nightcrawler as Louis "Lou" Bloom
 John Lithgow – Love Is Strange as Ben Hull
 David Oyelowo – Selma as Martin Luther King Jr.
| Julianne Moore – Still Alice as Dr. Alice Howland
 Marion Cotillard – The Immigrant as Ewa Cybulska
 Rinko Kikuchi – Kumiko, the Treasure Hunter as Kumiko
 Jenny Slate – Obvious Child as Donna Stern
 Tilda Swinton – Only Lovers Left Alive as Eve
|-
!Best Supporting Male
!Best Supporting Female
|-
| J. K. Simmons – Whiplash as Terence Fletcher
 Riz Ahmed – Nightcrawler as Rick
 Ethan Hawke – Boyhood as Mason Evans Sr.
 Alfred Molina – Love Is Strange as George Garea
 Edward Norton – Birdman as Mike Shiner
| Patricia Arquette – Boyhood as Olivia Evans
 Jessica Chastain – A Most Violent Year as Anna Morales
 Carmen Ejogo – Selma as Coretta Scott King
 Andrea Suarez Paz – Stand Clear of the Closing Doors as Mariana
 Emma Stone – Birdman as Sam Thomson
|-
!Best Screenplay
!Best First Screenplay
|-
| Dan Gilroy – Nightcrawler
 Scott Alexander and Larry Karaszewski – Big Eyes
 J. C. Chandor – A Most Violent Year
 Jim Jarmusch – Only Lovers Left Alive
 Ira Sachs and Mauricio Zacharias – Love Is Strange
| Justin Simien – Dear White People
 Desiree Akhavan – Appropriate Behavior
 Sara Colangelo – Little Accidents
 Justin Lader – The One I Love
 Anja Marquardt – She's Lost Control
|-
!Best First Feature
!Best Documentary Feature
|-
| Nightcrawler
 Dear White People
 A Girl Walks Home Alone at Night
 Obvious Child
 She's Lost Control
| Citizenfour – Laura Poitras 20,000 Days on Earth – Iain Forsyth and Jane Pollard
 The Salt of the Earth – Juliano Ribeiro Salgado and Wim Wenders
 Stray Dog – Debra Granik
 Virunga – Orlando von Einsiedel
|-
!Best Cinematography
!Best Editing
|-
| Emmanuel Lubezki – Birdman
 Darius Khondji – The Immigrant
 Sean Porter – It Felt Like Love
 Lyle Vincent – A Girl Walks Home Alone at Night
 Bradford Young – Selma
| Tom Cross – Whiplash
 Sandra Adair – Boyhood
 John Gilroy – Nightcrawler
 Ron Patane – A Most Violent Year
 Adam Wingard – The Guest
|-
! colspan="2"| Best International Film
|-
| colspan="2"| Ida (Denmark / France / Poland / United Kingdom) – Paweł Pawlikowski Force Majeure (France / Norway / Sweden) – Ruben Östlund
 Leviathan (Russia) – Andrey Zvyagintsev
 Mommy (Canada) – Xavier Dolan
 Norte, the End of History (Philippines) – Lav Diaz
 Under the Skin (Switzerland / United Kingdom) – Jonathan Glazer
|}

Films with multiple nominations and awards

Special awards

John Cassavetes AwardLand Ho!
 Blue Ruin
 It Felt Like Love
 Man From Reno
 Test

Robert Altman Award
(The award is given to its film director, casting director, and ensemble cast)

 Inherent Vice – Paul Thomas Anderson, Cassandra Kulukundis, Josh Brolin, Hong Chau, Benicio del Toro, Martin Donovan, Jena Malone, Joanna Newsom, Joaquin Phoenix, Sasha Pieterse, Eric Roberts, Maya Rudolph, Martin Short, Serena Scott Thomas, Katherine Waterston, Michael Kenneth Williams, Owen Wilson, and Reese Witherspoon

Kiehl's Someone to Watch Award
Recognizes a talented filmmaker of singular vision who has not yet received appropriate recognition. The award includes a $25,000 unrestricted grant funded by Kiehl's since 1851.

Rania Attieh and Daniel Garcia – H.
 Ana Lily Amirpour – A Girl Walks Home Alone at Night
 Chris Eska – The Retrieval

Piaget Producers Award
Honors emerging producers who, despite highly limited resources, demonstrate the creativity, tenacity and vision required to produce quality, independent films. The award includes a $25,000 unrestricted grant funded by Piaget.

Chris Ohlson
 Chad Burris
 Elisabeth Holm

Truer than Fiction Award
Presented to an emerging director of non-fiction features who has not yet received significant recognition. The award includes a $25,000 unrestricted grant funded by LensCrafters.

Dan Krauss – The Kill Team
 Sara Dosa – The Last Season
 Darius Clark Monroe – Evolution of a Criminal
 Amanda Rose Wilder – Approaching the Elephant

Special Distinction Award
(The award is given to its film director, producers, and ensemble cast for its uniqueness of "vision, honesty of direction and screenwriting, superb acting and achievement on every level of filmmaking")

 Foxcatcher – Bennett Miller (director/producer), E. Max Frye (writer), Dan Futterman (writer), Anthony Bregman (producer), Megan Ellison (producer), Jon Kilik (producer), Steve Carell (cast), Mark Ruffalo (cast), and Channing Tatum (cast)

References

2014
Independent Spirit Awards